The Neue Südtiroler Tageszeitung, shortened as Tageszeitung, is an Italian daily regional newspaper and one of two German-language daily newspapers published in South Tyrol. Founded in 1996, it holds social liberal views as opposed to the conservative stance of the Dolomiten, the oldest and most influential German newspaper in the autonomous province. Published from Tuesday to Sunday, the paper has an average daily circulation of 12,000 sales.

The Neue Südtiroler Tageszeitung evolved in 1996 from the weekly Südtirol Profil (South Tyrol Profile). It has a team of ten editors and a similar number of freelancers. It features articles and opinions ranging from current world affairs to sociopolitical topics. In the later field, its record of uncovering deficiencies and creating scandals has made the paper the object of several lawsuits.

See also
ff - Südtiroler Wochenmagazin

External links
 

1996 establishments in Italy
German-language newspapers published in Europe
German-language mass media in South Tyrol
Mass media in Bolzano
Newspapers established in 1996
Daily newspapers published in Italy